Vámonos al Dancing is the 14th album by Mexican singer Verónica Castro. It was released in 1993. The song, "Vámonos Al Dancing", is from Castro's show of the same name.

Track listing

 "Tú la Tienes Que Pagar"   (Felix Madrigal)   
 "Me Tomaste la Mano"    (Felix Madrigal)
 "Apariencias"    (Curi Fathal) 
 "Vámonos Al Dancing"    (Enrique Franco)     
 "Muchas Millas Corridas"    (Enrique Franco) 
 "Mal Perdedor"     (Enrique Franco)
 "La Cocaleca"    (Victor Cavalli) 
 "Furiosa"       (Felix Madrigal)  
 "Un Poquito de Tu Amor"     (Felix Madrigal)      
 "Supe Que Ya No Ibas a Volver"     (Enrique Franco)
 "La Creación"     (Felix Madrigal) 
 "El Quebradito"     (Enrique Franco)

Singles

1993 albums
Verónica Castro albums